Earle Marshall Brown (February 14, 1926 – September 10, 1969) was a Virginia lawyer and nine-year member of the Virginia House of Delegates representing Amherst County.

Early and family life
Earle Brown was born on February 14, 1926, at Pleasant View, Amherst County, Virginia, to farmer Eddie Brown and his wife Alma Belle Foster. He had a brother and sister and attended local schools, including Pleasant View High School and Lynchburg College.

During World War II, Brown served in the U.S. Navy in the Pacific Theater.

He then attended and graduated from the Washington and Lee University School of Law.

Earle Brown married schoolteacher Mary Elizabeth Jamerson of Bedford County, Virginia, in 1952, and they lived in Madison Heights. Brown was active in his church, Kiwanis, and Ruritans. He was also active in the local Democratic Party.

Career

After admission to the Virginia bar, Brown practiced law in Lynchburg, Virginia, and nearby counties. In 1955, he was elected as a Democrat to the Virginia General Assembly to represent Amherst County and Lynchburg (part-time) during Massive Resistance crisis. He was re-elected several times and served until 1965, declaring in April 1965 that he would not run for  re-election. When house districts were numbered beginning in 1962, his district became the 8th. Brown succeeded fellow lawyer and Democrat Harold B. Singleton and was succeeded by fellow lawyer and Democrat Donald G. Pendleton.

Death and legacy

Brown died of cancer on September 10, 1969, and was survived by his widow, who remarried. He was interred at Lynchburg's Spring Hill cemetery.

References

1926 births
1969 deaths
People from Amherst County, Virginia
Politicians from Lynchburg, Virginia
Members of the Virginia House of Delegates
20th-century American politicians
Virginia lawyers
University of Lynchburg alumni
Washington and Lee University School of Law alumni
People from Madison Heights, Virginia